National Highway 954, commonly referred to as NH 954 is a national highway in India. It is a spur road of National Highway 54.  NH-954 runs in the state of Rajasthan in India.

Route 
NH 954 connects Pakka Saharana, Morjanda Khari, Mamakhera, Lalgarh Jattan, Banwala, 4LNP and Kaluwala in the state of Rajasthan.

Junctions  
 
  Terminal near Pakka Saharaha.
  Terminal near Kaluwala.

See also 
 List of National Highways in India
 List of National Highways in India by state

References

External links 

 NH 954 on OpenStreetMap

National highways in India
National Highways in Rajasthan